Rumors is the third album by the North Carolina band Arrogance, released in 1976. It was their first album on a major label, Vanguard Records. In 2000, Don Dixon re-released all of Arrogance's albums on his own label, Dixon Archival Records. The version of "Rumors" contained two bonus tracks, demos of "Open Window" and "Final Nickel" recorded at Charlotte's Reflection Sound Studios in 1975.

Track listing
All tracks composed by Don Dixon; except where noted.
Side One
"We Live to Play" - 00:25
"Sunday Feeling" (Kirkland) - 3:56
"Final Nickel" - 3:04
"Two Good Legs" (Kirkland) - 3:27
"Dying To Know" (Kirkland) - 4:17
"Open Window" (Kirkland) - 3:48
Side Two
"Why Do You Love Me" - 2:57
"Lady Luck and Luxury" - 4:08
"Pitchin' Woo" (Kirkland) - 2:33
"I Doubt It" - 3:37
"It's Sad (But You Can't Really Hear Me at All)" - 3:34

Bonus tracks
"Open Window" (Demo) - 4:21
"Final Nickel" (Demo) - 3:46

Personnel
 Sanford Allen – concertmaster, strings, violin
 Ann Barak – violin
 Don Brooks – harmonica
 Scott Davison – drums, percussion
 Don Dixon – bass, vocals, arranger, calliope, conductor, guitar, percussion
 Robert Kirkland – guitar, percussion, vocals
 Charles Libove – violin
 Kermit Moore – cello
 Don Nixon – bass, percussion, vocals
 Larry Packer – fiddle
 John Pintavalle – violin
 Matthew Raimondi – violin
 Marty Stout – calliope, organ, piano, tack piano
 Eric Weissberg – banjo
Technical
 Captain Jeff Zaraya – engineer
 Ann Purtill – production supervisor
 Jules Halfant – art direction, design

References

Arrogance (band) albums
1976 albums
Vanguard Records albums
Albums produced by John Anthony (record producer)